This is a list of schools in the London Borough of Barnet, England.

State-funded schools

Primary schools
Source. (CE indicates Church of England, RC Roman Catholic schools, J Jewish).

Akiva School (J)
All Saints' Primary School, Childs Hill (CE)
All Saints' Primary School, Whetstone (CE)
Alma Primary School (J)
The Annunciation Infant School (RC)
The Annunciation Junior School (RC)
Ashmole Primary School
Barnfield Primary School
Beis Yaakov Primary School (J)
Beit Shvidler Primary School (J)
Bell Lane Primary School
Blessed Dominic Primary School (RC)
Broadfields Primary School
Brookland Infant School
Brookland Junior School
Brunswick Park Primary School
Chalgrove Primary School
Childs Hill Primary School
Christ Church Primary School (CE)
Church Hill School
Claremont Primary School
Colindale Primary School
Coppetts Wood Primary School
Courtland School
Cromer Road Primary School
Danegrove Primary School
Deansbrook Infant School
Deansbrook Junior School
Dollis Primary School
Edgware Primary School
Etz Chaim Primary School (J)
Fairway Primary School
Foulds School
Frith Manor Primary School
Garden Suburb Infant School
Garden Suburb Junior School
Goldbeaters Primary School
Grasvenor Avenue Infant School
Hasmonean Primary School (J)
Hollickwood Primary School
Holly Park Primary School
Holy Trinity Primary School (CE)
The Hyde School
Independent Jewish Day School (J)
Livingstone Primary School
London Academy
Manorside Primary School
Martin Primary School
Mathilda Marks-Kennedy Primary School (J)
Menorah Foundation School (J)
Menorah Primary School (J)
Millbrook Park Primary School
Monken Hadley School (CE)
Monkfrith Primary School
Moss Hall Infant School
Moss Hall Junior School
The Noam Primary School
Northside Primary School
The Orion Primary School
Osidge Primary School
Our Lady of Lourdes School (RC)
Pardes House Primary School (J)
Parkfield Primary School
Queenswell Infant School
Queenswell Junior School
Rimon Primary School (J)
Rosh Pinah Primary School (J)
Sacks Morasha Primary School (J)
Sacred Heart Primary School (RC)
St Agnes' Primary School (RC)
St Andrew's Primary School (CE)
St Catherine's Primary School (RC)
St John's Primary School, Friern Barnet (CE)
St John's Primary School, Whetstone (CE)
St Joseph's Primary School (RC)
St Mary's & St John's School (CE)
St Mary's Primary School, East Barnet (CE)
St Mary's Primary School, Finchley (CE)
St Paul's Primary School, Friern Barnet (CE)
St Paul's Primary School, Mill Hill  (CE)
St Theresa's Primary School (RC)
St Vincent's Primary School (RC)
Summerside Primary School
Sunnyfields Primary School
Trent Primary School (CE)
Tudor Primary School
Underhill School
Watling Park School
Wessex Gardens Primary School
Whitings Hill Primary School
Woodcroft Primary School
Woodridge Primary School
Wren Academy (CE)

Secondary schools

The Archer Academy
Ark Pioneer Academy
Ashmole Academy
Bishop Douglass Catholic School
Christ's College
The Compton School
Copthall School
East Barnet School
Finchley Catholic High School
Friern Barnet School
Hasmonean High School (Jewish)
Hendon School
Jewish Community Secondary School (Jewish)
London Academy
Menorah High School For Girls
Mill Hill County High School
Queen Elizabeth's School for Girls
St Andrew the Apostle Greek Orthodox School
St James' Catholic High School
St Mary's and St John's CE School
Saracens High School
The Totteridge Academy
Whitefield School
Wren Academy

Grammar schools
Henrietta Barnett School
Queen Elizabeth's School
St Michael's Catholic Grammar School

Special and alternative schools

Kisharon School
Mapledown School
Northgate School
Northway School
Oak Hill School
Oak Lodge School
Oakleigh School
Pavilion Study Centre

Further education
Barnet and Southgate College
Woodhouse College

Independent schools

Primary and preparatory schools

Annemount School
Ateres Beis Yaakov Primary School
Beis Soroh Schneirer
Edgware Jewish Girls - Beis Chinuch
Finchley and Acton Yochien School
Goodwyn School
Hendon Preparatory School
Holland House School
Kerem School
Nancy Reuben Primary School
Peninim
St Anthony's School for Girls
St Martin's Nursery and Preparatory School
Tashbar of Edgware
Torah Vodaas

Senior and all-through schools

Barnet Hill Academy
Beis Medrash Elyon
Beth Jacob Grammar School for Girls
Brampton College
Dwight School London
King Alfred School
Lubavitch Senior Boys School
Lubavitch Yeshiva Ketanah of London
Lyonsdown School
Menorah Grammar School
Mill Hill School
Mount House School
North London Grammar School
Pardes House Grammar School
Shiras Devorah High School
Susi Earnshaw Theatre School
Talmud Torah Tiferes Shlomoh
Tiferes High School
Unity Girls High School
Wentworth College

Special and alternative schools
Ellern Mede School
The Holmewood School
Woodside School

References

 
Barnet